Sagittaria fasciculata, the bunched arrowhead (also known as duck potato, Indian potato, or wapato) is a plant found in wetlands. This plant produces edible tubers that were heavily collected by the Native Americans as a food source.
STATUS: Endangered, Federal Register, July 25, 1979

Description
Sagittaria fasciculata is a perennial herb up to 35 cm tall. Submerged leaves are long and narrow, round in cross-section. Emerging leaves are flat, broadly ovate or lanceolate.

Distribution
Sagittaria fasciculata is only known to be found in Henderson and Buncombe Counties in North Carolina plus Greenville and Laurens Counties in South Carolina.

Habitat
Sagittaria fasciculata is found in seepage areas with little to no flow. It prefers shaded areas on sandy loams.

References

External links

Center for Plant Conservation National Collection Plant Profile, Sagittaria fasciculata

fasciculata
Endangered plants
Flora of South Carolina
Flora of North Carolina
Freshwater plants
Edible plants
Plants described in 1960